Cameron Johnston may refer to:

 Cameron Johnston (footballer) (born 1992), Australian player of Australian rules football and American football
 Cameron Johnston (wrestler) (born 1970), Australian freestyle wrestler

See also
Cameron Johnson (disambiguation)